Divani may refer to:
 Divani, Kerman
 Divani, Khuzestan